Everything I Touch Falls To Pieces is the debut full-length album from influential Chicago-based metalcore band Dead to Fall. The band shows a style in the vein of Swedish-influenced melodic death metal. The album's general theme deals with personal struggle and conflict with a loved one, often due to betrayal. The album is said to resemble the music of "At The Gates, The Haunted, with a touch of Killswitch Engage and Shadows Fall being added to the mix".

Track listing

Members
Jonathan Hunt - vocals
Bryan Lear - lead guitar
Seth Nichols - rhythm guitar
Justin Jakimiak - bass
Dan Craig - drums

Reception
 Allmusic  
 Punknews.org

Miscellanea
The song Tu Se Morta is a translated cover of a song from L'Orpheo by Claudio Monteverdi.
The song Eternal Gates of Hell is actually about a moment the band had at a toll booth where the attendant actually said "...and then I saw the blood coming." The "Carnage" and "Demise" parts were added because they thought it sounded cool.
Parts of the song Doraematu are an altered form of the Anonymous Spanish classical guitar work Romanza

References

Dead to Fall albums
2002 debut albums
Concept albums
Victory Records albums